Tropical Storm Arthur was the first tropical cyclone of the relatively quiet 2002 Atlantic hurricane season. The origins of the storm are believed to have been from a decaying cold front in the Gulf of Mexico, which dropped light to moderate rainfall across the southeastern United States. Developing on July 14 near the coast of North Carolina, Arthur tracked quickly east-northward through much of its duration as a tropical cyclone. The remnants of Arthur passed over Newfoundland with gusty winds and rainfall, where one person drowned. Arthur was the first tropical storm to form in the month of July since Alex of 1998.

Meteorological history

The origins of Tropical Storm Arthur are believed to have been from a decaying cold front in the northeastern Gulf of Mexico in July 2002. By July 9, a weak low-level circulation was first detected, in association with a broad low pressure area. Across the region, surface pressures were high, while upper level wind shear was marginally favorable for slow tropical development. The system tracked slowly north-northwestward, gradually becoming better defined, although thunderstorm activity remained limited and disorganized.

By July 11, dry air and unfavorable wind shear prevented the convection from developing near the center. The low became elongated, though on July 12 the overall convection became more concentrated as it turned to a northeast drift. An approaching mid-level trough caused the system to accelerate northeastward across Florida Panhandle, though upon doing so the thunderstorm activity quickly diminished. On July 13, forecasters expected the system to be absorbed by the approaching trough. However, the low pressure area emerged into the western Atlantic Ocean near North Carolina early on July 14, and upon doing so its convection increased and became better organized.

Upon becoming a tropical cyclone, the depression was moving quickly to the east-northeast, due to a deepening mid-level low south of the Canadian Maritimes. It maintained good upper-level outflow, and its track over the gulf stream allowed for steady strengthening. Early on July 15, convection increased over the center and developed an organized rainband southwest of the center; as a result, the National Hurricane Center upgraded the depression to Tropical Storm Arthur. Upon reaching peak intensity, the convection had become well-organized over the center despite westerly wind shear. Subsequently, the center became separated from the area of deepest convection, and Arthur maintained its peak intensity as it began transitioning into an extratropical cyclone. The storm turned northward around the larger mid-level low, and by July 17 Arthur completed extratropical transition. Shortly thereafter, the extratropical remnants crossed eastern Newfoundland. On July 19, the remnants of Arthur turned to a southeast drift between Newfoundland and Greenland, and by late in the day its winds decreased to below gale force.

Impact

Strong waves capsized a boat in the Conne River, killing one person.

Five ships recorded tropical storm force winds in association with Arthur, of which two were when the storm was extratropical.

See also

 List of North Carolina hurricanes (2000-present)
 List of Florida hurricanes (2000-present)
 Other tropical cyclones named Arthur

References

Arthur
Arthur (2002)
Arthur (2002)
Arthur (2002)
Arthur (2002)
Arthur